Bose, Basu, Bosu, Boshu or Bosh is a surname found amongst upper caste Kulin Kayasthas of West Bengal, India. The traditional Bengali version is Bosu, which is sometimes written Basu, which is alternately spelled as Bose. It from Sanskrit  (a name of Viṣṇu meaning ‘dwelling in all beings’).

History 
Boses belong to Kayastha caste in Bengal. The Bengali Kayasthas evolved between the 5th/6th century AD and 11th/12th century AD, its component elements being putative Kshatriyas and mostly Brahmins, according to André Wink. Boses are considered as Kulin Kayasthas of Gautam gotra, along with Ghoshes, Mitras and Guhas.
One of the twelve local rulers was King Pratapaditya of Jessore (currently in southern Bangladesh). At this time, the caste system was pretty much the way of life in India and certain communities were always expected to perform certain tasks. In order to rule the region, the King needed various types of people like Brahmins for religious purposes, Kshatriyas for war and defence, Baniyas for business etc. However, due to the invasion by Bakhtier Khilji, there was a shortage of such people in Bengal. He therefore requested the King of Kanauj (present day state of Uttar Pradesh) to send some appropriate people and it is said that five Brahmins and five Kayasthas (the five surnames Bose, Ghosh, Mitra, Guha and Dutta) were dispatched to Bengal. The first Bose to arrive was Dasarath Bose.

Notables of Indian descent
 Abala Bose (1865–1951), Indian social worker
 Amar Bose (1929–2013), MIT professor, founder and chairman of the Bose Corporation
Amit Bose (1930-2019), Indian filmmaker
Amit Bose (born circa 1972), American attorney and transportation policy advisor
Ankiti Bose (born 1992), Indian entrepreneur who works on the digitisation of the textile and apparel industry
 Ashish Bose (1930–2014), Demographer who coined BIMARU
Anurag Basu Flim Director
 Benoy Basu (1908–1930), Indian revolutionary
 Buddhadeb Bosu (1908–1974), Bengali writer
  Bipasha Basu Indian actress, model and represented India at Ford Models Supermodel of the World 
 Chandranath Basu doyen of economic nationalism in Bengal
 Fanindra Nath Bose (1888–1926), Bengal-born sculptor
 Girish Chandra Bose (1853–1939), Indian educator and botanist
 Jyoti Basu (1914–2010), Indian politician of the Communist Party (Marxist), 6th chief minister of West Bengal
 Jagadish Chandra Bose (1858–1935), Bengali physicist, science fiction writer, and student of radio science
 Kamal Bose (1915–1995), Indian cinematographer, winner of five Filmfare Awards
 Khudiram Bose (1889–1908), Indian freedom fighter
 Kaushik Basu is a formar chief Economist in World Bank
 Mankumari Basu (1863–1943), Bengali poet
 Mihir Bose (born 1947), Indian-born British journalist, former BBC's sports editor
 N. S. Chandra Bose (1932–2010), medical doctor and politician
 Nandalal Bose (1883–1966), Indian painter
 Pooja Bose (born 1987), Indian actress
 Pratap Bose (born 1974), British-Indian automotive designer
 Rahul Bose (born 1967), Indian actor
 Rajsekhar Bose (1880–1960), Bengali writer, chemist and lexicographer
 Raj Chandra Bose (1901–1987), Indian mathematician and statistician
 Rash Behari Bose (1886–1945), Indian freedom fighter
 Kaushik Basu (born 1952),  Professor of Economics at Cornell and Chief Economist at World Bank
 Sarat Chandra Bose (1889–1950), Indian lawyer and freedom fighter (brother of Subhas Chandra Bose)
 Soumya Sankar Bose (born 1990), Indian Artist and Photographer 
 Sarmila Bose (born 1959), Indian journalist and researcher
 Satyendra Nath Bose (1894–1974), Indian physicist, known for the Bose–Einstein collaborations
 Sachindra Prasad Bose (died 1941), designer of the Calcutta Flag
Shree Bose (born 1994), American scientist, winner of the inaugural Google Science Fair
 Sudhindra Bose (1883–1946), pioneer in teaching Asian politics and civilization in the United States
 Swadesh Bose (1928–2009), Bangladeshi economist
 Sugata Bose (born 1956), Harvard professor, Member of Parliament and grandnephew of Netaji Subhas Chandra Bose
 Subhas Chandra Bose (1897–1945), fighter of the Indian independence movement and eminent personality of the Indian National Army
 Uma Bose (1921–1942), 'The Nightingale of Bengal', musical prodigy
 Vivian Bose (1891–1983), judge of the Supreme Court of India and one of the founders of scouting in India
 C. V. Ananda Bose Current Governor Of Bengal

Notable others

 Georg Matthias Bose, (1710-1761), Leipzig born professor of natural philosophy and electrostatics inventor
 Sterling Bose (1906–1959), American jazz trumpeter and cornetist
 Sudip Bose, American emergency physician

von Bose is an unrelated German surname
 Julius von Bose (1809–1894), Prussian Army general
 Countess Louise von Bose (1813–1883), German philanthropist
 Herbert von Bose (1893–1934), German civil servant
 Jobst-Hilmar von Bose (1897–1949), German soldier
 Hans-Jürgen von Bose (born 1953), German composer

Bosé is an unrelated European surname
 Lucia Bosè (Italian spelling, born Lucia Borloni) or Lucía Bosé (Spanish spelling) (1931–2020), Italian actress
 Miguel Bosé (born 1956), Spanish singer and son of Lucia Bosè

References

Surnames
Indian surnames
Hindu surnames
Bengali-language surnames
Bengali Hindu surnames